A class reunion is a meeting of former classmates, often organized at or near their former high school or college, by one or more class members.  It is scheduled near an anniversary of their graduation, e.g. every 5 or 10 years. Their teachers and administrators may also be invited. Those attending reminisce about their student days and bring one another up to date on what has happened since they last met.

Some class reunions also include a reunion class gift to the institution.



Class reunions in film, television, and literature
In film, television, and literature, class reunions have been a device used to show the eruption of emotions such as shame, hatred, and guilt within individual characters who, suddenly faced again with their own youth, become aware that they have been unable to cope with their past.

Those who used to be mistreated by their teachers or classmates believe they can now take revenge on their former torturers. Participants often nostalgically reminisce about their old school days or fondly remember their school pranks. They can be concerned about how their lives have turned out compared with the lives of their former classmates, and can feel pressured enough to fabricate stories about their careers, personal accomplishments, and relationships.

Films, revolving around class reunions, include:

 Classmates
 '96
 Falling in Love Again (1980)
 National Lampoon's Class Reunion (1982)
 The Big Chill (1983)
 Peggy Sue Got Married (1986)
 “Archie: To Riverdale and Back Again” (1990)
 Kenneth Branagh's Peter's Friends (1992)
 Beautiful Girls (1996)
 George Armitage's Grosse Pointe Blank (1997)
 Romy and Michele's High School Reunion (1997)
 Since You've Been Gone (1998)
 10 years (2011)
 American Reunion (2012)
 Back in the Day (2014)
 Central Intelligence (2016)

Fiction, revolving around class reunions, include:

Tim O'Brien's July, July (2002)
Ben Elton's Past Mortem (2004)
Paul Reizin's Fiends Reunited (2004)
Philip Roth's American Pastoral (1997)
Simone van der Vlugt's De reünie'' (2004)

Television shows, loosely based on class reunions, include:

The Class of '62-episode of the Sitcom Only Fools and Horses (1991)
Mother and Child Reunion-episode of the teen drama Degrassi: The Next Generation (2001)
GCB (2012)

See also

 School and university in literature

Reunions
School terminology
Student culture
Nostalgia